This is a list of NCAA Women's Division I Volleyball Championship bids by school, as of the conclusion of the 2022 tournament field selection. Schools whose names are italicized are not currently in Division I and cannot be included in the tournament. There are a total of 64 bids possible (32 automatic qualifiers, 32 at-large).

Bids

References

NCAA Women's Volleyball Championship